Kabankalan, officially the City of Kabankalan , is a 1st class component city in the province of Negros Occidental, Philippines. According to the 2020 census, it has a population of 200,198 people making it the second most populous city in Negros Occidental next to Bacolod.

Kabankalan is also the second city with the highest gross and net income in Negros Occidental next to Bacolod. In terms of land area, Kabankalan City is the largest city in the province of Negros Occidental and is the second largest city in the entire Negros Island next to Bayawan of Negros Oriental with a total area of 697.35 km2

The city hosts three major festivals: the Kabankalan Sinulog every third Sunday of January (celebrated together with Cebu City), Udyakan sa Kabankalan and the Charter Anniversary. Kabankalan is also known for its Mag-aso Falls and the Balicaocao Resort.  Also located in the city is the main campus of the Central Philippines State University (CPSU).

Kabankalan City won the major award as the "Best Performing City" in Region VI in the 2011 Regional Search for Excellence in Local Governance (EXCEL). The award was given during the Pagdayaw 2011 program held at the Iloilo Grand Hotel in December 2011.

History

According to historians, the first inhabitants of Kabankalan were people who came from neighboring towns. They derived the name Kabankalan from the word "Bangkal", a species of a tree that is abundant in the place. The settlers established the Barangay form of government, with which every group has its own leader, called the Capitan.

In 1566 the Christianization of the Island of Negros began with the foundation of the mission of Binalbagan (1575), Tanjay (1580) and Ilog (1584) by the Augustinian missionaries. In 1622, at the request of Bishop Pedro de Arce of Cebu, the Recollects came to evangelize Negros. The spiritual administration of Binalbagan including that of Kabankalan was ceded to them. When the mission of Ilog was turned over to the Jesuits, it had four towns, Ilog being the chief town. The next was Kabankalan which already appears in a document dated 1630 as the center of encomienda of Admiral Cristobal de Lugo y Montalvo. The third was either Jima or Sima. The fourth was probably Su-ay. The Jesuits who served Kabankalan were Fr. Esteban Jayme. After the expulsion of the jesuits from the Philippines in 1767, the Dominican missionaries came to continue the spiritual administration of Negros with Father Manuel Diez assigned in Kabankalan in 1769. During the Spanish regime, Spaniards taught the people the Spanish language and introduced to them the Roman Catholic religion.

In 1830, The three Capitanes-Senor Polito Moreno, Senor Vicente Rojas and Senor Mariano Vingal-petitioned the government to transfer their barangay located at the Hilabangan River towards the area of Orong and established a town. They elected a migrant from Tigbauan, Iloilo-Senor Leocadio Tayum y Gregorio- their new head. The head served for one year. In 1856 Five Hundred commissaries and policeman of Governor Emilio Saravia stationed in the poblacion attacked the stronghold “made of trunk” of the local chief Manyabog at Carol-an who endured the Spanish artillery for a long time. They disbanded only when a stray bullet claimed the life of Manyabog. Seeing their leader killed, they set themselves on fire with their houses. The tribal suicide still lives in infamy to this day, three hundred of Manyabog's men were killed, seven died on the opposite side. Prior to the actual revolt in 1898, clandestine activities had already been in the offing, the leaders of the revolution such as Aniceto Lacson joining the Katipunan and others arming themselves. By mid-1896, arms were unloaded in Binicuil, Kabankalan for the hacienderos of Kabankalan, Ilog, Himamaylan, Su-ay and Cauayan but they refrained to join the revolt knowing that they were not prepared and had no confidence in victory. It was not until November 7, 1898, that Kabankalan took up arms after Bacolod was taken over from the Spanish authorities. The Cantonal Republic of Negros was declared on November 5, 1898.

When the Americans came, they introduced the democratic form of government. During this time, a lot of improvements came to the town and new modern techniques of farming were introduced by the Americans to the local farmers that improved their products. On April 2, 1903, the Philippine Commission passed Act No. 716 reducing the thirty four (34) municipalities of the Province of Negros Occidental to twenty-one (21) whereby the municipality of Cavancalan was merged to Ilog. On March 14, 1907, Philippine Commission passed Act. No. 1612 increasing the number of municipalities in the Province of Negros Occidental from twenty-one (21) to twenty–two (22) by separating from Ilog the former municipality of Cavancalan and reconstituting the same under the name Kabankalan. In mid-1907, a group of rebels called "Pulahanes" led by Papa Isio, raided the town and burned down all the houses. However, the people of Kabankalan quickly recovered and rebuilt the town from the destruction caused by the dissidents. Lorenzo Decena Zayco was elected Municipal President in a special election and took his oath of office, along with other elected officials on January 2, 1908. Pre War- Kabankalan saw the emerging development of the sugar industry. Sugar mills were put up in Hacienda Bearin and Hacienda San Isidro.

During the Second World War, Kabankalan was made a garrison town by Japanese Imperial Forces. Sugar mills were destroyed, school buildings were demolished and houses razed to ground. During this time, a recognized guerrilla unit and the local troops of the Philippine Commonwealth Army military were formed to oppose the foreign aggression and many people fled to the mountains to avoid Japanese military abuse. When the Americans returned to the island to aid Filipino soldiers under the Commonwealth Army and Constabulary, and the recognized guerrillas, they helped the people be freed from Japanese occupation. Post war era concentrated on rehabilitation efforts that saw the establishment of two Sugar Mills-Dacongcogon and SONEDCO-placing Kabankalan at the crossroad of agro industrial development and setting the ground as a hub of business and trade in Southern Negros. With the growth of the sugar industry, banks and other financial institutions and commercial establishments put up branches and offices in Kabankalan. The establishment of two sugar mills in the 1960s and early 1970s gave the town a boost into the list of the top improving towns of Negros.

Cityhood

The town of Kabankalan was declared by then President Fidel V. Ramos as a chartered city on August 2, 1997, under Republic Act No. 8297.

Geography

Kabankalan occupies the central portion of the Southern Negros Island and its geographically located at 10° north and 122° east. It is bounded on the north by the City of Himamaylan, on the northwest by Panay Gulf, on the southwest by the Municipality of Ilog and on the southeast by the Province of Negros Oriental. With an area of 697.95 square kilometers, it is the largest city in Negros Occidental and the second largest in the whole Negros Island, after Bayawan (which has an area of 699.08 square kilometers).

Kabankalan is over an hour's drive south of Bacolod City by private car while public utility vehicles reach the place in about two hours. The city, which serves as the hub of economic activities in southern Negros, is also the take-off point for various destinations down south, and links the province to Dumaguete, capital of Negros Oriental, via the Kabankalan-Mabinay Highway. Its location roughly halfway between Bacolod and Dumaguete made it to supposedly host the regional center of the then Negros Island Region, along with neighbouring Mabinay to its southeast in Negros Oriental. Once completed, the Kabankalan City Domestic Airport will be the second active airport in the province (after the Bacolod-Silay International Airport).

Climate

Kabankalan has Type 3 climate condition which means dry season is from December to May while the rainy season is from June to November. Average temperature is 26 degrees Celsius (80 degrees Fahrenheit).

Barangays

Kabankalan City is politically subdivided into 32 barangays.

Demographics

Major languages are Hiligaynon, followed by Cebuano (both of those languages are used interchangeably in to day-to-day activities) with English and Filipino being used as second languages.

The city is the only place where the Karol-an language is used. Due to its geographical area of usage, the Karol-an language is classified as a vulnerable language, making its conservation a top priority, as it is vital to the culture and arts of Kabankalan natives.

Kabankalan City, along with the cities of Sipalay, Escalante, Cadiz, Sagay and San Carlos and the municipalities of Hinoba-an, Don Salvador Benedicto, La Castellana, Moises Padilla, Toboso and Calatrava, are the only places in Negros Occidental who are bilingual speakers, as the people in those areas can speak and understand both Cebuano (Bisaya) and Hiligaynon (Ilonggo) at the same time, due to the influx of Cebuano-speaking settlers in those areas.

Economy

References

External links

Kabankalan City Official Website
 [ Philippine Standard Geographic Code]
Philippine Statistics Authority
Philippine Census Information
Local Governance Performance Management System

Cities in Negros Occidental
Populated places established in 1907
1907 establishments in the Philippines
Component cities in the Philippines